Caitlin Elizabeth Joelle Meyer (born February 29, 1992) is an American actress. She has won two Young Artist Awards for her performances.

Filmography

Film

Television

References

External links
 CaitlinEJMeyer.com
 

1992 births
Living people
American child actresses
American film actresses
American television actresses
American stage actresses
Actresses from Salt Lake City
Latter Day Saints from Utah
American people of English descent
20th-century American actresses
21st-century American actresses